The VeggieTales Show (often marketed as simply VeggieTales) is an American Christian computer-animated television series created by Phil Vischer and Mike Nawrocki. The series served as a revival and sequel of the American Christian computer-animated franchise VeggieTales. It was produced through the partnerships of TBN, NBCUniversal, Big Idea Entertainment, and Trilogy Animation, and ran from October 22, 2019, to April 1, 2022.

Vischer, Nawrocki, and Lisa Vischer reprised their respective roles as the voices of Bob the Tomato, Larry the Cucumber, and Junior Asparagus, with Kurt Heinecke returning to compose the show's music score. They are joined by the creative team led by show-runner Todd Waterman (who worked on such projects as the 1998 Disney film Mulan and Transformers: Prime). It was the last VeggieTales production to involve the Vischers, Nawrocki and Heinecke before their departure from the franchise in 2021, and the last VeggieTales production to feature Big Idea Entertainment as a corporate entity, before the company shut down production in 2021.

Premise
The show focuses on the VeggieTales characters putting on Broadway-style shows in Mr. Nezzer's theater that retell Bible stories and parody mainstream Pop-culture. Each episode begins with a question in the form of a letter from a kid, and then Bob and Larry respond to that question by putting on a show. Bob the Tomato attempts to use the show to accomplish his dream of becoming the next Mister Rogers. According to Vischer, "the thing that drives Bob crazy is when Mister Rogers does Mister Rogers, everything goes perfectly. Nothing ever goes wrong on ‘Mister Rogers’ Neighborhood.’ And Bob wants that for his show, but he can never achieve it.” Each show never goes the way that Bob had initially planned, resulting in complete and total chaos.

Phil Vischer says "It's really all about Bob and Larry wanting to put on a show for kids. They want to teach things to kids. Bob wants to help kids, Larry wants to help Bob."

Most of these episodes act out stories and lessons from the Bible. Among the show's episodes are a nine-episode arc about the fruit of the Spirit, and stories focusing on LarryBoy and the League of Incredible Vegetables. According to Phil Vischer, the first season consists of 18 episodes in which he would write the first ten and Nawrocki would write the last eight. The series provided VeggieTales content through 2021.

Characters

Phil Vischer stated in a radio interview that no new characters will be created for this television program. In addition to series regulars, characters from VeggieTales spin-offs have appeared, including Callie Flower from VeggieTales in the House and Awful Alvin from Larryboy: The Cartoon Adventures. The VeggieTales Show brings back Mr. Nezzer, as the owner of the theater in which the show takes place, who has been absent from the previous two television shows.

Voice cast
Phil Vischer as Bob the Tomato/Thingamabob, Archibald Asparagus/Alfred, Mr. Lunt/S-Cape, Mr. Nezzer (Eps 13–18, 20–26), Jimmy Gourd, Pa Grape, Phillipe Pea, Goliath, Scallion #1, Radio Announcer, Krazy Kenny (2021), Guy Broccoli
Mike Nawrocki as Larry the Cucumber/LarryBoy, Jerry Gourd, Jean-Claude Pea, Li'l Pea, Scallion #2 & #3, Delivery Veggie, Qwerty, Mother Nezzer, the Milk Money Bandit, Frank, Krazy Kenny/Houston (2022)
Lisa Vischer as Junior Asparagus/Ricochet
David Mann as Mr. Nezzer (Eps 1–12, 19)
Kira Buckland as Petunia Rhubarb/Vogue, Laura Carrot
Stephanie Southerland as Madame Blueberry/Mayor Blueberry, Callie Flower, Miss Minchin
Elise Napier as Miss Achmetha
 Joe Zieja as Dr. Flurry, the Emperor of Envy, Jesse, Buttons Crimini
Sean Chiplock as Scallini, Scooter, Awful Alvin
Todd Waterman as Khalil
Melissa Mabie as Adele Pepper

Production
When DreamWorks bought Classic Media and Big Idea Entertainment in 2012, all VeggieTales productions produced at Big Idea were to be controlled and overseen by DreamWorks. As a result, DreamWorks launched production of the Netflix original series VeggieTales in the House in late 2013 and announced that it would shut down production of the original VeggieTales direct-to-DVD series after the release of its 58th episode entitled VeggieTales: Noah's Ark in 2015. DreamWorks replaced the original creative crew that had been working at Big Idea Entertainment for nearly two decades with an entirely new team of nearly 75 artists led under the direction of Doug TenNapel. VeggieTales creators Phil Vischer and Mike Nawrocki were given no control over the creative content of VeggieTales in the House and were only allowed to provide the characters' voices. Since DreamWorks ordered 78 22-minute episodes for VeggieTales in the House in 2013, production of the last 13 episodes wrapped up in the summer of 2017 and DreamWorks' team left Big Idea Entertainment to work on new animated series for Netflix such as Trolls: The Beat Goes On! and Dragons: Rescue Riders. DreamWorks then sold Big Idea Entertainment's headquarters in Franklin, Tennessee once production concluded. While the last season of VeggieTales in the City premiered on Netflix in the fall of 2017, marketing employees continued to work for Big Idea Entertainment.

VeggieTales in the House received mixed to unfavorable reviews from critics and audiences alike, with criticisms directed towards the new animation style, comical tone, and general unfaithfulness compared to the original VeggieTales videos.

In 2016, DreamWorks’ founder Jeffrey Katzenberg sold the studio to NBCUniversal. As discussions to revise the series began to take place in 2018, DreamWorks Animation, under authority from NBCUniversal, would now manage Big Idea Entertainment itself as a in-name-only unit through DreamWorks Classics, with Universal Pictures to handle future distribution of any and all Big Idea/VeggieTales productions. NBCUniversal also moved Big Idea's headquarters to Tustin, California in 2019.

In late 2018, Vischer received a phone call from The Trinity Broadcast Network, which was in talks to license VeggieTales from NBCUniversal in order to create a new reboot. TBN, which had been trying to buy VeggieTales for nearly a decade, asked if he would be interested in reprising the voice of Bob the Tomato for the reboot. Vischer said that he wasn't interested in being part of the new reboot unless he had a role in shaping the creative and educational content for the show. As a result, NBCUniversal and TBN allowed him to view an early draft of the pilot. Vischer was encouraged by the fact that the early draft of the pilot reflected the heart of the classic episodes from the original series, instead of VeggieTales in the House and VeggieTales in the City. NBCUniversal and TBN then allowed Vischer to rewrite the pilot. Before long, he and Nawrocki signed on as head-writers, executive producers, and voice actors for the reboot.

As a result of VeggieTales in the House's poor reception, Vischer and Nawrocki made The VeggieTales Show feel as much like the original series as possible, bringing back the original character designs and many members of the creative team from the original series including Big Idea Entertainment's original music director, Kurt Heinecke, and lead storyboard artists/director, Tod Carter. Lisa Vischer, the original voice of Junior Asparagus, also returned from a five-year hiatus to reprise the role.

After a few years away from VeggieTales, Vischer revealed some of his regrets of the original series. According to Vischer, he spent years making VeggieTales "persuade kids to behave Christianly without teaching them Christianity". With this being said, Vischer has made The VeggieTales Show go more theologically in-depth than the previous few series (from the "Netflix era"). It teaches the tenets of Christianity rather than just teaching children to behave morally. Vischer also wouldn't be returning as the voice of Mr. Nezzer as it was announced in late September 2019 that David Mann of Tyler Perry fame would take over the role, though Vischer later filled in as the voice of the character in select episodes.

Due to the high number of iTunes digital downloads for the pilot, “The Best Christmas Gift”, as well as the large number of DVDs sold in the first two weeks of its release, TBN ordered an additional eight episodes for the first season on November 1, 2019, bringing the total number of episodes to 26.

Distribution
In 2019, Yippee TV became the exclusive streaming service of The VeggieTales Show, with the plan of releasing episodes monthly and through 2022. The Christmas special premiered on TBN On Christmas Day of 2019. The rest of the series did not begin to broadcast on TBN until January 2022 on Saturday mornings. In February 2022, Big Idea and NBCUniversal partnered with Minno, a Christian children's streaming platform, to stream the series.

Select episodes have been released on DVD, including the pilot episode The Best Christmas Gift in 2019 and three episodes within the Fruit of the Spirit Stories Vol. 1 in 2021.

Setting
The show takes place in a theater that is owned by Mr. Nezzer. The VeggieTales characters perform on a broadway-style stage. There are other veggies watching the show from the seats in the auditorium and balconies. There is also a backstage area in which the VeggieTales characters plan and practice the shows. It is inspired by the setting of The Muppet Show, with similarities in visual and conceptual design to the Muppet Theater and its backstage area.

Episodes

References

External links

2019 American television series debuts
2010s American animated television series
2010s American children's comedy television series
2020s American animated television series
2020s American children's comedy television series
2022 American television series endings
American children's animated comedy television series
American children's animated education television series
American children's animated musical television series
Animated television series reboots
English-language television shows
VeggieTales
Big Idea Entertainment television series
Trinity Broadcasting Network original programming
Christian children's television series
Christian animation
American computer-animated television series